2008–09 Taça de Portugal was the 86th season of Portuguese football knockout tournament. The competition started on August 30, 2008 with the First Round and ended with the Final held in on May 31, 2009. The defending champions were Sporting CP.

First round
In this round entered teams from second (3rd level) and third division (4th level). A number of teams received a bye to the Second Round: Fátima (III), União da Madeira (III),  Abrantes (III), Lagoa (III), Torreense (III), Lusitânia dos Açores (IV), Marinhas (IV), Vila Meã (IV), Madalena (IV), Amares (IV), Mondinense (IV), Portosantense (IV), Fornos de Algodres (IV), Louletano (IV), Coimbrőes (IV), Cinfães (IV), Caldas (IV), Futebol Benfica (IV) and Académico Viseu (IV). The matches were played on August 30, 31, September 4, 6 and 7, 2008.

1Maia were disqualified from the competition.Note: Roman numerals in brackets denote the league tier the clubs participate in during the 2008–09 season.

Second round
This round featured winners from the previous round, teams that received a bye in the First Round and all teams from Liga de Honra (2nd level). The matches were played on September 13 and 14, 2008.

1Abrantes were disqualified from the competition.Note: Roman numerals in brackets denote the league tier the clubs participate in during the 2008–09 season.

Third round
In this round entered winners from the previous round as well as all teams from Portuguese Liga. The matches were played on October 18 and 19, 2008.

|}
Note: Roman numerals in brackets denote the league tier the clubs participate in during the 2008–09 season.

Fourth round
In this round entered winners from the previous round. The matches were played on November 8, 9 and 10, 2008.

|}
Note: Roman numerals in brackets denote the league tier the clubs participate in during the 2008–09 season.

Fifth round
In this round entered winners from the previous round. The matches were played on December 13 and 14, 2008.

|}
Note: Roman numerals in brackets denote the league tier the clubs participate in during the 2008–09 season.

Quarterfinals
The matches were played on January 28, 29 and February 17, 2009.

|}
Note: Roman numerals in brackets denote the league tier the clubs participate in during the 2008–09 season.

Semifinals
The draw was held on February 5, 2009. The first legs were played on March 3 and 22, 2009. The second legs was played on April 22, 2009.

First legs

Second legs

Paços de Ferreira won 5–4 on aggregate

Porto won 3–2 on aggregate

Final

References

External links
 Official site 
 Taça de Portugal on rsssf.com

Taça de Portugal seasons
Taca De Portugal, 2008-09
Taca De Portugal, 2008-09